Kushkak (also Romanized as Kūshkak) is a village in Nesa Rural District, Asara District, Karaj County, Alborz Province, Iran.

It is located in the Alborz (Elburz) mountain range.

At the 2006 census, its population was 121, in 34 families.

References 

Populated places in Karaj County
Settled areas of Elburz